Irreligion in Ireland pertains to the population of Ireland that are atheist, agnostic, or otherwise unaffiliated with any religion. The 2016 census recorded that 9.8% of the population was irreligious; the second largest category after Roman Catholicism. 

Ireland was traditionally devoutly Catholic throughout most of its modern history. However, irreligion in Ireland is growing and increased seven-fold between the 1991 census and 2016 census.

Church attendance is declining in Ireland and, as of 2012, Ireland ranked in the Top 10 Atheist Populations in a survey which questioned 50,000 people from 57 countries.

As of 2018, Ireland was ranked 115th by the International Humanist and Ethical Union in a list of best countries to live in as an atheist.

Statistics 
A 2006 Dentsu poll found that 7% of Ireland had no religion. According to Greeley (2003), 5% of those in Ireland do not believe in God, but only 2% accept the self-identification of “atheist.” According to Ingelhart et al. (2004) and Davie (1999), 4% of the Irish do not believe in God.

In a 2007-2008 Gallup Poll, 42% of Ireland answered no to the question "Does religion occupy an important place in your life?" and in the 2011 Gallup, 53% of Ireland answered no.

A 2010 Bishops Conference survey found that 10.1% of Irish Roman Catholics did not believe in God.

According to a 2012 WIN-Gallup International poll, Ireland had the 2nd highest decline in religiosity from 69% in 2005 to 47% in 2012, while those who considered themselves not a religious person increased from 25% in 2005 to 44% in 2012. The poll also showed that 10% of Ireland now consider themselves convinced atheists, which is a vast increase from 2005. This number is thought to be higher due to citizens describing themselves as "cultural Catholics".

According to the 2016 census of Ireland, approximately 9.8% of people in Ireland were irreligious.

Organisations 
The Humanist Association of Ireland (HAI) and Irish Freethinkers and Humanists represent the non-religious in Ireland, as well as specifically those who identify as humanists. The HAI received the ability to conduct legal marriages in 2012. As of 2018, the HAI conducts more marriages in Ireland than the Church of Ireland, but less than the Catholic Church.

Atheist Ireland is a group representing atheists in Ireland. It has advocated for a repeal of blasphemy laws, non-denominational schools, an end to discrimination against atheists and secular charities.

See also
 Irreligion in the United Kingdom
 Irreligion in Europe

References

Religion in the Republic of Ireland
Ireland
Irreligion in Ireland